In economics, the wage share or labor share is  the part of national income, or the income of a particular economic sector, allocated to wages (labor). It is related to the capital or profit share, the part of income going to capital,
which is also known as the K–Y ratio.
The labor share is a key indicator for the distribution of income.

The wage share is countercyclical; that is, it tends to fall when output increases and rise when output decreases. Despite fluctuating over the business cycle, the wage share was once thought to be stable, which Keynes described as "one of the most surprising, yet best-established facts in the whole range of economic statistics".
However, the wage share has declined in most developed countries since the 1980s.

Definition

The wage share can be defined in various ways, but empirically it is usually defined as total labor compensation or labor costs over nominal GDP or gross value added.

Often the capital share and labor share are assumed to sum to 100%, so that each can be deduced from the other. For example, the Bureau of Labor Statistics defines the labor share in a given sector (LS) as the ratio of labor compensation paid in that sector (C) to current dollar output (CU), ie. LS = C / CU. The non-labor or capital share (NLS) is defined as 1 − LS.

In Capital in the Twenty-First Century, Piketty described the accounting identity α = r × β as the 'first fundamental law of capitalism', where α represents the capital share, r is the rate of return on capital, and β is the capital to income ratio.
Piketty defined the wage share as 1 − α.

Because the self-employed perform labor which is not rewarded with wages, the labor share may be underestimated in sectors with a high rate of self-employment. One approach is to assume the labor share of proprietors' income to be fixed.
The OECD and the Bureau of Labor Statistics adjust labor compensation by assuming that the self-employed have the same average wage as employees in the same sector.

History

The importance of the distribution of income between the factors of production – capital, land and labor – has long been recognized. Ricardo (1817) said that to determine the laws which regulate this distribution is the "principal problem in political economy".

Cobb and Douglas's Theory of Production (1928) introduced empirically-determined constants α and β which corresponded to the capital and labor share respectively. Cobb and Douglas found that the wage share was about 75%.
For most of the 20th century, constant labor share was a stylized fact known as Bowley's law.

Historical measurements of the wage share can be charted using the Federal Reserve Bank of St. Louis's FRED tool, which includes time series published by the Bureau of Labor Statistics
and Bureau of Economic Analysis.

See also
Factors of production
Factor shares
Compensation of employees
Measures of national income and output
Value added
Income distribution
Labor economics
Rate of exploitation

References

Further reading
 Labour Income Share Ratios for OECD countries, 1995-2010, at OECD.Stat
 Michael D. Giandrea and Shawn Sprague. Estimating the U.S. labor share. Monthly Labor Review, Feb 2017, https://doi.org/10.21916/mlr.2017.7

Welfare economics
Macroeconomic indicators
National accounts
Labour economics indices